The  is a DC electric multiple unit (EMU) train type operated by West Japan Railway Company (JR-West) in Japan on limited express services in the Kyoto and Osaka area since October 2015. The trains were converted from former dual-voltage (1,500 V DC and 20 kV AC) 683-2000 series EMUs formerly used on Shirasagi services and made surplus following the 14 March 2015 timetable revision.

Operations

The 289 series trains were initially introduced on 31 October 2015 on Hashidate, Kinosaki, Kounotori (formed as 4- or 4+3-car sets) and on Kuroshio services formed as 6- or 6+3-car sets services, displacing the remaining JNR-era 381 series EMUs. Since the timetable revision on 26 March 2016, the 4- or 4+3-cars sets are used only on Kounotori services.

While the trains are similar in appearance and performance characteristics to the 287 series trains, they cannot operate in multiple.

Formations
, the fleet consists of five six-car sets and three three-car sets (39 vehicles in total) based at Kyoto Depot for use on Kuroshio services, and seven four-car sets and six three-car sets (46 vehicles in total) based at Fukuchiyama Depot for use on Kounotori services.

6-car Kuroshio sets
The six-car Kuroshio sets, numbered J01 to J05, are formed as follows.

Cars 1 and 4 each have one scissors-type pantograph.

3-car Kuroshio sets
The three-car Kuroshio sets, numbered I01 to I03, are formed as follows.

Car 7 has one scissors-type pantograph.

4-car Kounotori sets

The seven four-car Kounotori sets, numbered FG401, FG403, FG406, FG408 to FG411 and based at Fukuchiyama Depot, are formed as follows.

Cars 1 and 3 each have one scissors-type pantograph.

From 2016, the KuRo 288-2000 cars were modified with only half of the car assigned as "Green car" (first class) seating, and reclassified KuRoHa 288-2000.

3-car Kounotori sets

The six three-car Kounotori sets, numbered FH302 to FH305, are formed as follows.

Car 5 has one scissors-type pantograph.

Exterior
The sets based at Fukuchiyama Depot for use on Kounotori services are finished in the same livery as the Fukuchiyama-based 287 series EMUs also used on these services, with a thin maroon line below the windows. The sets based at Kyoto Depot for use on Kuroshio services have an "ocean green" turquoise line below the windows.

Interior
The 289 series trains feature western-style toilets, universal access toilets, and AC outlets for passenger use are provided on the end walls of the passenger saloons.

History
JR-West announced the first details of its plans to introduce the new 289 series trains on 28 April 2015. The first four-car set converted was test-run in May 2015.

The trains entered revenue service from 31 October 2015, replacing older 381 series trains.

Set FH301 was returned to the 683 series from April 2019. Set FH306 followed suit in June 2019.

References

External links

 JR-West 28 April 2015 press release 

West Japan Railway Company
Electric multiple units of Japan
Train-related introductions in 2015

ja:JR西日本289系電車
Hitachi multiple units
1500 V DC multiple units of Japan